Philtraea is a genus of moths in the family Geometridae.

Species
Philtraea albimaxima Buckett, 1971
Philtraea elegantaria (Edwards, 1881)
Philtraea latifoliae Buckett, 1971
Philtraea mexicana Buckett, 1971
Philtraea monillata Buckett, 1971
Philtraea paucimacula Barnes & McDunnough, 1918
Philtraea surcaliforniae Buckett, 1971
Philtraea utahensis Buckett, 1971

References

External links
Natural History Museum Lepidoptera genus database

Ourapterygini